Idaea flaveolaria is a moth of the family Geometridae first described by Jacob Hübner in 1809.

Distribution
This species can be found in Spain, the French Alps, Italy, Switzerland, Austria and eastern Russia.

Description
The basic color of the wings is bright brown orange. On the forewings and hindwings there are two brown transversal lines, often almost indistinct. These transversal lines appear more clearly on the underside of the wings, together with a dark discal spots. The edge of the wings shows a blackish fringe.

Biology
Adults are on wing in July and August. The larvae feed on withered leaves of herbaceous low-growing plants.

References

External links

Lepiforum e.V.
"Idaea flaveolaria (Hübner, 1809)". Schmetterlinge der Schweiz.

Sterrhini
Moths of Europe
Moths described in 1809
Taxa named by Jacob Hübner